Turgenev (masculine) or Turgeneva (feminine) is a Russian surname which derives from the Mongolian word "Тургенев" (turgen, meaning fast/quick).

Notable people with the surname include the following:

Ivan Petrovich Turgenev (fl. 1796-1803), rector of the Moscow State University
Alexander Turgenev (1784-1846), Russian historian and statesman
Nikolay Turgenev (1789–1871), Russian economist
Ivan Turgenev (1818-1883), Russian novelist and playwright, who is the eponym of the  main-belt asteroid 3323 Turgenev
Pierre-Nicolas Tourgueneff (1853–1912) (original spelling was "Turgenev"), French sculptor and painter

Russian-language surnames

ru:Тургенев_(фамилия)